Uruguayan Spanish (Spanish: Español uruguayo or castellano uruguayo) is the variety of Spanish spoken in Uruguay and by the Uruguayan diaspora. Uruguayan Spanish is recognized as a variety of Rioplatense Spanish.

Influences 

 There is strong influence of Italian and its dialects, particularly Genovese, because of the presence of large Italian communities in the country (for example in Montevideo and Paysandú). The Uruguayan accent differs from the accents of Spain and other Spanish American countries, except for Argentina, due to Italian influence. There are many Italian words incorporated in the language (nona, cucha, fainá ("farinata, chickpea flour crêpe"), chapar, parlar, festichola ("house party"), etc.), as well as words of Italian derivation (for example: mina derived from femmina, or pibe ("child") from pivello).
 In the southeastern department of Rocha, as well as along the northern border with Brazil, there is some influence of Portuguese. This includes Portuñol: a combination of Portuguese and Spanish that is often described as code-switching and sometimes as an emergent hybrid or mixed language.

Tuteo and voseo  

The variety of Spanish used in Montevideo and the whole southern region of the country exhibits use of the voseo form of address, with the pronoun vos instead of the tú form. In other areas of the country, tú is more commonly used than vos. In some places, tú is used, but with the conjugation corresponding to vos, as in: tú tenés, instead of tú tienes (tuteo) or vos tenés (voseo). Tuteo is much more commonly used in Rocha and in some parts of Maldonado.

The formal pronoun usted is used in very formal contexts, such as when speaking to government authorities.

Vocabulary

Below are vocabulary differences between Uruguay and other Spanish-speaking countries: Argentina, Paraguay, Spain, Mexico, Costa Rica, Chile, and Puerto Rico. It shows how Spanish is different in three continents where there are Spanish-speaking countries (Europe, North America, and South America) and in different regions of those continents (Central America, Caribbean, and Southern Cone). Italian and Brazilian Portuguese have also been influential in Uruguayan Spanish and are also included. While people in Uruguay and most of Argentina speak the dialect Rioplatense, there are some notable differences in vocabulary between the two countries, which are bolded.

See also

 Languages of Uruguay
 Rioplatense Spanish
 Lunfardo
 Diccionario del español del Uruguay

References

Spanish dialects of South America
Languages of Uruguay
European-Uruguayan culture